The 1938 Fylde by-election was held on 30 November 1938.  The by-election was held due to the death of the incumbent Conservative MP, Edward Stanley.  It was won by the Conservative candidate Claude Lancaster.

References

1938 elections in the United Kingdom
1938 in England
1930s in Lancashire
Borough of Fylde
By-elections to the Parliament of the United Kingdom in Lancashire constituencies